The Men's 100 kg judo competitions at the 2022 Commonwealth Games in Birmingham, England took place on August 3rd at the Coventry Arena. A total of 13 competitors from 11 nations took part.

Results
The draw is as follows:

Repechages

References

External link
 
 Results
 

M100
2022